Anthene fasciatus, the tiny ciliate blue, is a butterfly in the family Lycaenidae. It is found in Sierra Leone, Liberia, Ivory Coast, Ghana, Nigeria (south and the Cross River loop), Cameroon, Gabon and the eastern part of the Democratic Republic of the Congo. The habitat consists of forests.

References

Butterflies described in 1895
Anthene
Butterflies of Africa